Leonard Gregory Kastle (February 11, 1929 – May 18, 2011) was an American opera composer, librettist, and director, although he is best known as the writer/director of the 1969 film The Honeymoon Killers, his only venture into the cinema, for which he did all his own research. He was an adjunct member of the SUNY Albany music faculty.

Following his high school education in Mount Vernon, New York, Kastle began his musical training at the Juilliard School of Music (1938–40). From 1940 to 1942, he attended the Mannes School of Music and later studied composition at the Curtis Institute of Music in Philadelphia (1944–50), earning a B.A. in 1950. While at the Curtis Institute, he held scholarships in composition with Rosario Scalero, Gian-Carlo Menotti and Samuel Barber, and a piano scholarship with Isabelle Vengerova. He attended Columbia University from 1947 to 1950.

In 1956, Kastle composed a thirteen-minute "made-to-measure" opera, titled The Swing, for two singers, a speaking part, and piano accompaniment. It was commissioned by and broadcast on the NBC television network on Sunday, June 10, 1956, at noon. He also wrote The Pariahs, about the sinking of the whaler Essex, a trilogy of operas about the Shakers known under the collective title The Passion of Mother Ann: A Sacred Festival Play, a children's opera called Professor Lookalike and the Children, a piano concerto, sonatas for piano and violin, and three unproduced screenplays, Wedding at Cana, Change of Heart, and Shakespeare's Dog. 

In a 2003 interview for the Criterion Collection, he said that no producer wanted Wedding at Cana, just another Honeymoon Killers, which he did not want to do. After The Honeymoon Killers, Kastle returned to teaching and composing. After the Criterion release of the film, he was rediscovered by a new generation of cult film enthusiasts and occasionally attended film-related events such as the Ed Wood Film Festival in 2007, where he served on the panel of judges

Kastle died May 18, 2011, at his home in Westerlo, New York, at the age of 82.

References

External links

Leonard Kastle's Obituary & Condolence Book
Interview with Leonard Kastle, October 23, 1988

1929 births
2011 deaths
20th-century classical composers
21st-century classical composers
American opera composers
Male opera composers
American people of Russian-Jewish descent
American male classical composers
American classical composers
American male screenwriters
American classical pianists
Male classical pianists
American male pianists
University at Albany, SUNY faculty
Curtis Institute of Music alumni
People from Albany County, New York
People from Westchester County, New York
20th-century classical pianists
21st-century classical pianists
20th-century American pianists
21st-century American pianists
20th-century American composers
Film directors from New York (state)
Screenwriters from New York (state)
Classical musicians from New York (state)
20th-century American male musicians
21st-century American male musicians